Miankuh (also Romanized as Mīānkūh) is a village in Ziaran Rural District, in the Central District of Abyek County, Qazvin Province, Iran. At the 2006 census, its population was 108, in 30 families.

References 

Populated places in Abyek County